This is a list of marae (Māori meeting grounds) in the Auckland Region of New Zealand.

Great Barrier Island

Rodney

West Auckland

Central Auckland

Māngere

Franklin

See also
 Lists of marae in New Zealand
 Tāmaki Māori

References

Auckland Region, List of marae in the
Marae
Marae in the Auckland Region, List of